Jimena Hoyos Souza (born Dec. 31, 1977) is an actress from Bogotá, Colombia. Jimena Hoyos has worked in television, short-films, and films outside Colombia. She is most known for her role in The Devil Wears Prada and for being runner-up in the Soap Net Original Series I Wanna Be a Soap Star.

Background and career
Jimena studied plastic arts in Colombia. She moved to the United States and worked as a magazine as editor. She took acting classes at Stella Adler Studio of Acting and in Sheila Gray Acting studio. After two weeks of taking acting classes, she started to play roles in TV series in Colombia. Because of her success, she moved to the United States where started to act in some films, short films and series, and worked as a model.

Career
 Francisco el Matemático (1999) - Colombia
 Solterita y a la Orden - Colombia
 Se armó la gorda - Colombia
 Héroes de Turno
 La Madre
 Hombres de Honor
 The Devil Wears Prada (2006)
 I Wanna Be a Soap Star (short roles)
 Dexter, series
 Pizza, Peanuts and Wine
 New In Town (2009)

Personal life
Jimena was born in Colombia. and she has roots in the southern countries of South America where her family was born. Jimena shows up her incredible own sensitiveness, her ability to transmit what she wants, her creativity, and her sense of being touched by the nature not only by acting in the films she participates, in but also spreading all of her sentiments for the dogs by taking photographs of street dogs and creating their own frames with her foundation called "Gozques" dedicated for the welfare of the dogs in the streets, in memoria of her dog "Zico" when he died.

Gozques Foundation 
Jimena has been very active with her foundation named Gozques and she has been feeding more than one hundred dogs daily with a  food dispenser for dogs she created in a very creative and efficient way to keep the street dogs with food.
Also, she has been designing the frames for the pictures she takes of the dogs making them with different elements she takes from junkyards getting them reusable becoming the design of the frame fitted with the environment of the picture. She persuaded many celebrities to embrace that cause like the British racing driver Sam Reklaw who she advised to decorate his race car with the logos of the various animal shelters in order to raise some sort of awareness.

References

External links

1977 births
Colombian film actresses
Living people
20th-century Colombian actresses
21st-century Colombian actresses